Cyathea arborea (vernacular English: West Indian treefern, vernacular Spanish: helecho gigante or palo camarón) is a plant of the family Cyatheaceae in the order Cyatheales. Tree ferns are an ancient growth form of plant, although Cyatheales evolved fairly recent and are only distantly related to earlier tree ferns. Like other modern fern they originate and almost exclusively grow in tropical and subtropical forests, with one species native to the Mediterranean. This species of tree fern is native to the Caribbean, including Cuba, Hispaniola, and the El Yunque National Forest in Puerto Rico.

Description
This perennial fern can reach a height of 27 feet. It has a thornless trunk measuring from 3 to 5 inches. The surface of the trunk is hard with a soft, white core.
Its crown has 10 or more leaves in the form of a fan. When they are young, its leaves are rolled up and as they grow they unroll until they reach their horizontal position.
As with all ferns, species of the Cyatheaceae reproduce from spores.  These are produced in  small sporangia on the bottom side of their leaves.

Habitat and ecology

Tree ferns as a group are mostly found it wet tropical forest, with Cyathea arborea itself being found in locations such as such as Puerto Rican moist forests and Hispaniolan moist forests.  While they can grow under a canopy, it is likely that natural disturbances such as landslides and hurricanes create gaps in the forest canopy that allow them to regenerate.

References

arborea
Flora of the Caribbean
Plants described in 1753
Taxa named by Carl Linnaeus
Flora without expected TNC conservation status